Mimenicodes perroudi is a species of beetle in the family Cerambycidae. It was described by Xavier Montrouzier in 1861. It is known from New Caledonia.

References

Enicodini
Beetles described in 1861